Malaysia participated in the 2021 Southeast Asian Games in Hanoi, Vietnam from 12 to 23 May 2022. The Malaysian contingent consisted of 584 athletes, competing in 37 out 40 sports (all except Handball, Vovinam and Wrestling), 58 percent of which are debutants.

Background

Preparations
Datuk Haji Hamidin Haji Mohd Amin, President of the Football Association of Malaysia (FAM) was initially appointed as the delegation's Chef de Mission on 9 March 2021. However, he resigned to focus on his responsibilities as deputy president of Olympic Council of Malaysia (OCM), and was replaced by Malaysian Karate Federation (MAKAF) secretary-general, Datuk Paduka Nur Azmi Ahmad for the position on 14 September 2021.

On 29 December 2021, the OCM Selection Committee under the Chairmanship of OCM President Tan Sri Dato’ Sri Norza Zakaria held a meeting to discuss the selection criteria for the 2021 Southeast Asian Games and decided that:

 For individual sports, athletes must be at least in the top three of their respective events to qualify as Category A, and top six as Category B (reduced from top eight due to tightened criteria);
 For team sports, a team needs to be in top four to be considered under Category A;
 The Committee will utilise competitions from 2018 to February 2022 as basis for selection; And,
 The deadline for entry by name will be on 12 March 2022.

On 23 April 2022, the OCM announced diver Nur Dhabitah Sabri to be the flag bearer at the Opening Ceremony and unveiled a new set of apparel for the national delegation sponsored by Yonex-Sunrise and made from TruVapor, a type of multi-groove micropolyester fibre which absorbs and dispels sweat quickly; subsequently lowering body temperature.

During the flag handover ceremony at Bukit Jalil, Kuala Lumpur on 27 April 2022, Malaysian Youth and Sports Minister Ahmad Faizal Azumu announced the 146-medal target for the delegation, which consists of 36 gold, 35 silver and 75 bronze medals. Several factors were taken into consideration when setting the target, such as the lack of events which the national delegation is capable of winning medals, as well as the constraints due to the COVID-19 pandemic, which resulted in the postponement and cancellation of many tournaments worldwide.

Broadcasters

Medal summary

Medal by sport

Medal by date

Medalists

Archery

Recurve

Compound

Athletics 

Men

Women

Badminton 

Malaysia will be sending a total 20 badminton players, 10 players per gender.

Men

Women

Mixed

Basketball 

Basketball 3x3

Basketball 5x5

Billiards 

Men

Women

Bodybuilding

Bowling

Chess 

Men

Women

Cycling 
Mountain biking

Road cycling

Dancesport

Diving 

Malaysia will be sending a total of 12 divers, 7 male and 5 female.

Men

Women

Esports

Fencing

Men

Women

Finswimming 

Men

Women

Mixed

Football

Malaysia will only be participating in the men's tournament, sending a total of 20 players.

Futsal

Golf

Individual

Team

Gymnastics

Artistic

Men 
All-around

Apparatus Finals

Women 
All-around

Apparatus Finals

Rhythmic 
Individual and Group Qualification

Karate 

Kumite

Kata

Kickboxing 

Men

Women

Judo

Jujitsu

Kurash

Muay Thai

Pencak silat 

Seni

Tanding

Pétanque 
Shooting

Doubles

Triples

Rowing 

Men

Sepak takraw 

 Men

Women

Shooting

Swimming 

Men

Women

Table tennis 

Men

Women

Mixed

Team

Taekwondo

Tennis 

Men

Women

Mixed

Triathlon 

Triathlon

Duathlon

Volleyball

Beach

Indoor

Weightlifting 

Men

Women

Wushu 

Taolu

Sanda

Xiangqi 

Men

Women

References

2022 in Malaysian sport
2021
Nations at the 2021 Southeast Asian Games